Parker is a 1984 British crime film directed by Jim Goddard and starring Bryan Brown, Cherie Lunghi and Kurt Raab, in which a British businessman disappears on a visit to Germany. The film premiered at the MIFED international film and multimedia market in Milan on 1 November 1984 before being released theatrically in the UK on 3 May 1985.

Cast
 Bryan Brown - David Parker 
 Cherie Lunghi - Jenny Parker 
 Kurt Raab - Haag 
 Elizabeth Spriggs - Mrs. Epps 
 Bob Peck - Rohl 
 Beate Finckh  - Sister 
 Gwyneth Strong - Andrea 
 Simon Rouse - Richard 
 Uwe Ochsenknecht - Boots Man 
 Micha Lampert - Tall Man 
 Dana Gillespie - Monika 
 Ingrid Pitt - Widow 
 Phil Smeeton - Reich 
 Tom Wilkinson - Tom 
 Hannelore Elsner - Jillian Schelm

References

External links

1984 films
British crime drama films
1980s crime films
Films directed by Jim Goddard
Films set in West Germany
Films shot in Germany
1980s English-language films
1980s British films